Hemicycliophora is a genus of nematodes belonging to the family Hemicycliophoridae.

The genus has cosmopolitan distribution.

Species:

Hemicycliophora andrassyi 
Hemicycliophora aquatica 
Hemicycliophora arenaria 
Hemicycliophora belemnis 
Hemicycliophora biformis 
Hemicycliophora chilensis 
Hemicycliophora conida 
Hemicycliophora diolaensis 
Hemicycliophora epicharoides 
Hemicycliophora floridensis 
Hemicycliophora fluvialis 
Hemicycliophora hellenica 
Hemicycliophora iberica 
Hemicycliophora italiae 
Hemicycliophora labiata 
Hemicycliophora loofi 
Hemicycliophora lutosa 
Hemicycliophora macristhmus 
Hemicycliophora micoletzkyi 
Hemicycliophora nucleata 
Hemicycliophora oostenbrinki 
Hemicycliophora paracouensis 
Hemicycliophora robusta 
Hemicycliophora strenzkei 
Hemicycliophora subbotini 
Hemicycliophora thienemanni 
Hemicycliophora thornei 
Hemicycliophora triangulum 
Hemicycliophora typica 
Hemicycliophora wyei 
Hemicycliophora zuckermani

References

Nematodes